The Seventh Australian Recording Industry Association Music Awards (generally known as the ARIA Music Awards or simply The ARIAS) was held on 14 April 1993 at the Entertainment Centre in Sydney. Host, Richard Wilkins, was assisted by presenters, James Reyne, Elle Macpherson, Billy Birmingham, Tim Finn, Neil Finn, Daryl Somers and others, to distribute 24 awards. There were live performances and the awards were televised.

In addition to previous categories, a Special Achievement Award was presented to former Countdown host and music commentator Molly Meldrum who provided one of the longest acceptance speeches in ARIA history. The ARIA Hall of Fame inducted: Peter Allen and Cold Chisel.

Ceremony details

Former Countdown host and music commentator Molly Meldrum provided one of the longest speeches in ARIA history upon accepting his Special Achievement Award. At the 1991 ceremony Gary Morris, manager for Midnight Oil, had provided a 20-minute acceptance speech. Meldrum had publicly disapproved of Morris' speech both its content and excessive length—they had also had a shouting match at the ARIAs in 1988. Music journalist, Anthony O'Grady, described Meldrum's 1993 speech, "[he] reeled off some 50 names starting with Ronnie Burns and Ronnie's Aunt Edna [Edna is Burns' mother], ending with a dedication to his adopted son Morgan. The speech contained a classic line describing his time as a mimer in Kommotion: 'I can't mime and I can't talk properly yet'."

Presenters and performers 

The ARIA Awards ceremony was hosted by TV personality Richard Wilkins. Presenters and performers were:

Awards

Nominees for most awards are shown, in plain, with winners in bold.

ARIA Awards

Album of the Year 
Diesel – Hepfidelity
Hunters & Collectors – Cut
Ed Kuepper – Black Ticket Day
Wendy Matthews – Lily
Rockmelons – Form 1 Planet
Single of the Year 
Wendy Matthews – "The Day You Went Away"
Baby Animals – "One Word"
Crowded House – "Weather with You"
Diesel – "Tip of My Tongue"
Weddings Parties Anything – "Father's Day"
Highest Selling Album 
Australian Cast Recording – Jesus Christ Superstar
Diesel – Hepfidelity
Rockmelons – Form 1 Planet
Noiseworks – Greatest Hits
Wendy Matthews – Lily
Hoodoo Gurus – Electric Soup/Gorilla Biscuit
Highest Selling Single 
Wendy Matthews – "The Day You Went Away"
Euphoria – "One in a Million"
John Paul Young – "Love Is in the Air"
Frente! – "Accidently Kelly Street"
Girlfriend – "Take It From Me"
Kate Ceberano, Jon Stevens, John Farnham (cast of Jesus Christ Superstar) – "Everything's Alright"
Best Group
Crowded House – "Weather with You"
Baby Animals – "One Word"
The Black Sorrows – Better Times
The Cruel Sea – This Is Not the Way Home
INXS – Welcome to Wherever You Are
Best Female Artist 
Wendy Matthews – Lily
Kate Ceberano – "I Don't Know How to Love Him"
Deborah Conway – "Release Me"
Deni Hines – "That Word (L.O.V.E.)"
Margaret Urlich – Chameleon Dreams
Best Male Artist
Diesel – Hepfidelity
Jimmy Barnes – "Ain't No Mountain High Enough"
Paul Kelly – Paul Kelly Live
Jon Stevens – "Superstar"
Chris Wilson – Landlocked
Best New Talent 
Things of Stone and Wood – Share This Wine
Caligula – Caligula (EP)
Girlfriend – Make It Come True
Rick Price – "Not a Day Goes By"
Tiddas – Inside My Kitchen
Breakthrough Artist – Album
Frente! – Marvin the Album
Company of Strangers – Company of Strangers
The Dukes – Harbour City
Rick Price – Heaven Knows
Chris Wilson – Landlocked
Breakthrough Artist – Single
Frente! – "Ordinary Angels"
Company of Strangers – "Motor City (I Get Lost)"
Rick Price – "Not a Day Goes By"
The Sharp – Talking Sly (EP)
Things of Stone and Wood – "Share This Wine"
Best Country Album 
Lee Kernaghan – The Outback Club
James Blundell – This Road
Colin Buchanan – Hard Times
Keith Urban & Slim Dusty – "Lights on the Hill"
Brent Parlane – Brent Parlane
Best Independent Release 
Ed Kuepper – Black Ticket Day
The Jackson Code – Strange Cargo
Def FX – Blink (EP)
Melanie Oxley & Chris Abrahams – Welcome to Violet
TISM – Beasts of Suburban
Best Indigenous Release 
Yothu Yindi – "Djäpana (Sunset Dreaming)"
Kev Carmody – Street Beat
Coloured Stone – Inma Juju
Gondwanaland – Wide Skies
Tiddas – Inside My Kitchen
Best Adult Contemporary Album 
Andrew Pendlebury – Don't Hold Back That Feeling
Marina Prior – Aspects of Andrew Lloyd Webber
Various – Stairways to Heaven
Various – Strictly Ballroom
Anthony Warlow – On the Boards
Best Comedy Release 
Various – Stairways to Heaven
The 12th Man – Still the 12th Man
Agro – Agro Kids Dance Album
Andrew Denton & the Cast of Live & Sweaty – "I Don't Care As Long As We Beat New Zealand"
Norman Gunston featuring Effie – "Amigos Para Siempre"/"Venereal Girl (Tribute to Madonna)"

Fine Arts Awards
Best Jazz Album 
Bernie McGann – Ugly Beauty
Judy Bailey – Notwithstanding
Paul Grabowsky – Tee Vee
Vince Jones – Future Girl
James Morrison & Ray Brown – Two the Max!
Best Classical Album 
Australian Chamber Orchestra & Richard Tognetti – Janáček: Kreutzer Sonata for Strings, Barber: Adagio for Strings, Walton: Sonata for Strings
The Brandenburg Orchestra – The Brandenburg Orchestra
West Australian Symphony Orchestra – The Transposed Heads
Geoffrey Lancaster – Mozart Sonatas for Fortepiano
Roger Woodward – The Music of Frédéric Chopin
Best Children's Album 
ABC Symphony Orchestra – Classic Kids
Franciscus Henri – Walking on the Milky Way
Mike Jackson – Rufty Tufty
George Spartels – George from Play School
The Tin Lids – Snakes & Ladders
Best Original Soundtrack / Cast / Show Recording 
John Clifford White – Romper Stomper
Australian Cast Recording – Jesus Christ Superstar
Ricky Fataar & Others – Spotswood
Paul Grabowsky – The Last Days of Chez Nous
Various – Strictly Ballroom
Nigel Westlake – Antarctica

Artisan Awards
Song of the Year 
Mick Thomas – "Father's Day" – Weddings Parties Anything
Suze De Marchi (co-writer) – "One Word" – Baby Animals
Diesel (co-writer) – "Tip of My Tongue" – Diesel
Neil Finn, Tim Finn – "Weather With You" – Crowded House
Bryan Jones, Jonathan Jones, Raymond Medhurst (co-writers) – "That Word (L.O.V.E.)" – Rockmelons featuring Deni Hines
Producer of the Year
Simon Hussey – Daryl Braithwaite – "Nothing to Lose", Company of Strangers – "Daddy's Gonna Make You a Star", "Motor City (I Get Lost)", "Sweet Love"
David Hirschfelder – John Farnham, Kate Ceberano, Jon Stevens – "Everything's Alright", Kate Ceberano – "I Don't Know How to Love Him"
Joe Camilleri – Black Sorrows – "Ain't Love the Strangest Thing", "Better Times", "Come on, Come On" – The Revelators – "Caribbean Wind"
Rockmelons – "Form one Planet", "It's not Over"
Tony Cohen – The Cruel Sea – This Is Not the Way Home, TISM – "Get Thee to a Nunnery"
Engineer of the Year 
Greg Henderson – Yothu Yindi –  "Dharpa", "Tribal Voice"
Adrian Bolland – Margaret Urlich – "Boy in the Moon", "Cover to Cover"; – Teen Queens – "Can't Help Myself", "Love How You Love Me"
Doug Brady – 1927 – "Scars"; – Eve – "What a Lover"; – Lisa Edwards – "Cry", "So Dangerous"
Doug Roberts – Stephen Cummings – "Keep the Ball Rolling"
Niven Garland – INXS – "Baby Don't Cry", "Heaven Sent", "Taste It"
Best Video 
Stephen Johnson – Yothu Yindi – "Djäpana"
Robbie Douglas-Turner – Frente! – "Ordinary Angels"
Paul Elliott – Boom Crash Opera – "Bettadaze"
Paul Goldman – Lisa Edwards – "Cry"
Chris Langman – The Sharp – Talking Sly (EP)
Best Cover Art 
Paul McNeil, Richard All – Hoodoo Gurus – Electric Soup / Gorilla Biscuit
Angie Hart, Louise Beach – Frente! – Marvin the Album
Ian Martin, Adrienne Overall – Diesel – Hepfidelity
Midnight Oil, Neo One Design – Midnight Oil – Scream in Blue
Pascoe & Gray Design, Eryk Photography – The Black Sorrows – Better Times

Special Achievement Award
Ian "Molly" Meldrum

ARIA Hall of Fame inductees
The Hall of Fame inductees were:
Peter Allen
Cold Chisel

References

External links
ARIA Awards official website
List of 1993 winners

1993 music awards
1993 in Australian music
ARIA Music Awards